All This and Rabbit Stew is a 1941 Merrie Melodies cartoon directed by Tex Avery. The cartoon was released on September 13, 1941, and features Bugs Bunny.

Because of the cartoon's racial stereotypes of African-Americans, United Artists decided to withhold it from television syndication in the United States beginning in 1968. As such, the short was placed into the so-called Censored Eleven, a group of eleven Merrie Melodies and Looney Tunes shorts withheld from U.S. television distribution. It was one of 12 cartoons to be pulled from Cartoon Network's 2001 "June Bugs" marathon by order of AOL Time Warner, on grounds of the subject material's offensiveness. Mel Blanc and Darrell Payne were not credited for their voice works.

Plot
An unnamed African American hunter (who is very similar in speech pattern and mannerism to Stepin Fetchit) walks over to a rabbit hole where Bugs is eating his carrots. Bugs is led to a trunk where he tricks the hunter into destroying the tree. Bugs distracts the hunter after introducing himself, and digs underground and when the hunter realizes that Bugs has his gun. Bugs has the hunter run far enough so he can go down the rabbit hole. Realizing that he has been fooled, the hunter uses a toilet plunger to catch Bugs. However, Bugs tickles the hunter and flees into another rabbit hole. The hunter grabs the plunger, only to find a skunk under him. Next, Bugs lures the hunter into a cave, where they encounter a black bear. All three of them run into the rabbit hole and when Bugs and the hunter realize the bear is in the hole, they run off in fright.

Realizing that Bugs is on the hunter while walking, the hunter fires off a swarm of anthropomorphic birdshot bullets. In a madcap chase, the bullets chase Bugs into a series of holes, including a "fake" golf hole and the cave where the skunk is at. Bugs then lures the hunter into a log sitting on the edge of a cliff, through which the hunter runs numerous times (each time running to the other side as Bugs spins the log around so that the hunter keeps running off the cliff) until he falls to the ground. Bugs is confronted by the angered hunter and, in a desperate plea for his life, baits the hunter into playing what turns out to be a "strip" dice game. Bugs wins the game and walks off mocking the hunter's speech and wearing the hunter's clothes, leaving the man with a leaf covering his crotch to quip "Well call me Adam." Adding further insult to injury, Bugs grabs the leaf during the "iris out", leaving the hunter completely naked.

Analysis
The film contains a reference to World War II, when the hunter threatens to Blitzkrieg Bugs.

The hunter is identified in his model sheet as "Tex's Coon". The hunter fills the role usually associated with Elmer Fudd; this was one of four Bugs Bunny short films of 1941 which have him facing a different hunter each time (the others were Hiawatha's Rabbit Hunt, in which Bugs faced an Indian; The Heckling Hare, in which Bugs faces Willoughby the Dog; and Wabbit Twouble, which pits Bugs against Fudd). A later scholar, John Stausbauch, described the hunter in terms of racial stereotype: as a "shufflin', big lipped, sleepy-eyed country coon", who cannot resist a game of craps. The Stepin Fetchit-like character has his shuffling and mumbling exaggerated for comic effect.

The hunter is dressed in a hat, a short-sleeved shirt, overalls and oversized shoes. A character with the same attire and demeanor would later be used in Angel Puss (1944). He essentially plays a stereotypical Sambo role in the film, and was named Sambo in its publicity material, as he had been in Rabbit Stew.

The hunter's and Bugs' reaction from the bear's unexpected appearance from the rabbit hole (horn sound included) was somewhat reused in Wabbit Twouble (1941).

The giant hollow log gag was reused in The Big Snooze (1946), Foxy by Proxy (1952), and Person to Bunny (1960).

Reception
Motion Picture Herald (Sept 13, 1941): "The little colored Sambo decides to try his hand at capturing Bugs Bunny, but meets with the same success as his predecessors. Just as he has the screwy rabbit cornered, Bugs Bunny entices him into a craps game, and little Sambo winds up a sadder and wiser hunter."

Boxoffice (Sept 14, 1941): "One big, long hand. That's what this Technicolor cartoon is. It shows unmistakable signs of extra effort, preparation and ingenuity in all departments. The central character, a little bitty colored Sambo, is a cinch to capture fun-loving audiences. Here he decides to go gunning for some rabbits. He meets up with a nimble-witted adversary that has little Sambo in a constant dither."

Motion Picture Exhibitor (Sept 17, 1941): "Sambo, a little negro boy, goes rabbit hunting, meets cynical Bugs Bunny, the screwy rabbit... This is a very funny reel in every respect — characters, situations, and story. If the feature is heavy or not so good, this will make the customers feel good anyhow."

The Film Daily (Sept 12, 1941): "A Bugs Bunny Howl: Having eluded Hiawatha and other Leon Schlesinger characters, Bugs Bunny this time is pursued by Sambo in a riotous short that will make anyone laugh, and laugh hard. Trying to describe the action would be like trying to explain a maise but the Technicolor cartoon is about as mirth provoking as anything has any right to be."

Home media
 VHS – 50 of the Greatest Cartoons (released by Starmaker Entertainment Inc.)
 DVD – Cartoon Craze Presents: Bugs Bunny: Falling Hare (released by Digiview Productions)

Notes
This cartoon is the final Avery-directed Bugs Bunny short to be released. Although it was produced before The Heckling Hare (after the production of which Avery was suspended from the Schlesinger studio and defected to Metro-Goldwyn-Mayer), it was released afterwards. The title is a parody of that of All This, and Heaven Too (1940), a Bette Davis film from the same studio. Because the cartoon was released after Avery left Warner Bros, Avery's name does not appear in the credits.
This cartoon fell into the public domain in 1969 in the United States when United Artists, the copyright owners to the Associated Artists Productions package, failed to renew the copyright in time.
Along with Notes to You, the film was completed and shipped on September 2, 1941.

See also
 List of animated films in the public domain in the United States

Citation

Further reading

References

External links

 
 
 

1940s English-language films
1941 short films
1941 animated films
1940s animated short films
1941 comedy films
Articles containing video clips
Censored Eleven
Films directed by Tex Avery
Films about hunters
Merrie Melodies short films
Warner Bros. Cartoons animated short films
African-American comedy films
Bugs Bunny films
Films produced by Leon Schlesinger
1940s Warner Bros. animated short films
American animated short films
Animated films about rabbits and hares
African-American animated films